Thomas W. Gallant is a historian who specializes in modern Greek history and archaeology.

He is holder of the Nicholas Family Endowed Chair in Modern Greek History at the University of California, San Diego. From 2002 to 2007 he held the Hellenic Heritage Foundation Chair of Modern Greek History at York University in Toronto. Before that he was professor of Greek history and anthropology as well as a member of the Center for Greek Studies at the University of Florida.

He is the editor-in-chief of the ten-volume Edinburgh History of the Greeks, the co-director of the UC San Diego Center for Hellenic Studies and a past president of the Modern Greek Studies Association.

Books
The Edinburgh History of the Greeks, volume 9. The Long Nineteenth Century, 2014 
Πολιτισμός, ταυτότητα και εξουσία στα Επτάνησα, 1817-1864: Βιώματα αποικιακής κυριαρχίας  
Murder on Black Mountain: Love and Death on a Nineteenth Century Greek Island
Modern Greece, Experiencing Dominion: Culture, Identity and Power in the British Mediterranean
winner of 2003 MGSD Best Book Prize
The 1918 Anti-Greek Riot in Toronto
 About the 1918 Toronto anti-Greek riot. The book was presented at the House of Commons, Canada in 2005  and a documentary was shot in 2010 based on the book
Modern Greece: Society, Politics and Economy, translated into Greek as:
 Νεωτέρη Ελλάδα. Μια κοινωνική και πολιτική ιστορία 
Outlaws: Bandits, Pirates and the Making of the Modern World 
Athens: A Social History

References

Year of birth missing (living people)
Living people
21st-century American historians
American male non-fiction writers
University of California, San Diego faculty
Academic staff of York University
University of Florida faculty
Historians of modern Greece
21st-century American male writers